Three Nights of Love is a 1964 omnibus comedy film in three segments directed by Renato Castellani, Luigi Comencini and Franco Rossi and starring Catherine Spaak, Enrico Maria Salerno and Adolfo Celi.

Cast
 Adolfo Celi (segment "La moglie bambina")
 Anna Maria Checchi
 Diletta D'Andrea as Gabriella (segment "La moglie bambina")
 Rina Franchetti
 John Phillip Law as Fra Felice (segment "Fatebenefratelli")
 Tiberio Murgia
 Dante Posani
 Aldo Puglisi (segment "La vedova")
 Enrico Maria Salerno as Giuliano (segment "La moglie bambina")
 Renato Salvatori as Nicola (segment "La vedova")
 Joe Sentieri
 Catherine Spaak as Ghiga (segment "Fatebenefratelli"), Giselle (segment "La vedova"), Cirilla (segment "La moglie bambina")
 Toni Ucci

References

External links

1964 films
1964 drama films
Italian drama films
1960s Italian-language films
Films directed by Renato Castellani
Films directed by Luigi Comencini
Films directed by Franco Rossi
1960s Italian films